Felix Klieser (born 3 January 1991) is a German professional hornist. He was born without arms. He plays the French horn by using his left foot to action the valves and without placing a limb inside the bell (this is in contrast to the way the instrument is traditionally played, which entails using the left hand to action the valves and placing the right hand inside the bell). The horn is held on a tripod.

He was born in Göttingen. He began playing the horn at age 4. He studied at the Hanover University of Music. In 2016 he received the Leonard Bernstein Award.

References

German classical horn players
1991 births
Living people
Musicians from Göttingen
People without hands